Juan Carlos Alom (born December 1964 in Havana, Cuba) is a Cuban photographer. Alom is a photographer and an experimental filmmaker. His artistic career started in the 1990s in Havana.

Solo exhibitions 
 2009 - Esperamos en el Monte Claro, Galería Villa Manuela, Havana, Cuba.
 2003 - Ritual a la Ceiba. 8th Havana Biennial, Cuba.
 2001 - Shifting Tides: Cuban photography after the Revolution. Tim B. Wride, Los Angeles County Museum of Art, LA.
 2001 - Sombras Espesas. Throckmorton Gallery, New York City.
 2000 - Sombras Secretas, Throckmorton Fine Art, New York City.
 1998 - Iturralde Gallery, West Hollywood, California.
 1996 - " The Dark Book/El Libro Oscuro. Juan Carlos Alom", Throckmorton Fine Art, Inc., New York City
 1996 - "El voluble rostro de la realidad ", Centro de Desarrollo de las Artes Visuales(CDAV), Havana
 1995 -  "Arenas Movedizas" together with Luis Gómez this was part of a very large visual event "Una de Cada Clase" organized by Ludwig Foundation in Cuba.
 1990 -  "Laura", Fototeca de Cuba, Havana.

Group exhibitions 
 2004 - "Mapas Abiertos, 100 Años de la Fotografía Latinoamericana", Fundación Telefónica, Madrid, Spain.
 2004 - "Mapas Abiertos, 100 Años de la Fotografía Latinoamericana"; Palau de la Virreina, Barcelona, Spain
 1999 - "Queloides", Centro de Desarrollo de las Artes Visuales, Havana, Cuba.
 1999 - "Latinoamérica 92", Kuntbysningen, Denmark

Screenings 
 2009 - Experimental video and video art: Artists from Cuba. Museo D'Antioquia, Colombia.
 2009 - Diario. Salle Zero, Alianza Francesa, Havana, Cuba.
 2008 - Habana Solo. Visionarios, Audiovisual en Latinoamérica, Sao Paulo: Itaú Cultural, Brasil.
 2008 - Las ciudades invisibles, Videos sobre Arte, Arquitectura y Ciudad. Colegio Territorial de Arquitectos, Valencia, Spain.
 2007 - Ultramar, Videoartistas hispanoamericanos. Centro Cultural Sao Paulo, Brasil.
 2007 - Habana Solo. Ambulante Gira de Documentales, México
 2006 - Fast Forward III, 28 Festival Internacional del Nuevo Cine Latinoamericano, Havana, Cuba.
 2004 - Presentación de Habana Solo, 15 min en película de 16 mm. Video Marathon. Museo del Barrio, NY.
 2004 - Pabellón Cuba, 35 mm b/n 54´. 8th Havana Biennial, Cuba.
 2004 - Iroko. 16 mm b/n 15´. Ciudadela La California. 8th Havana Biennial, Cuba.
 2003 - 17e Encontres video art plastique. Wharf Centre d'Art Contemporain de Basse Normandie, France.

Collections 
 Ludwig Forum for International Art, Germany,
 Fototeca de Cuba, Havana
 IF, Milan, Italy,
 Bronx Museum, New York City
 FOTOFEST, Houston, Texas
 Southeast Museum of Photography, Daytona Beach, Florida

References
 Osvaldo Salas, Roberto Salas, & Gregory Tozian; Fidel's Cuba: A Revolution in Pictures; ( Atria Books/Beyond Words 1999); 
  José Veigas-Zamora, Cristina Vives Gutierrez, Adolfo V. Nodal, Valia Garzon, Dannys Montes de Oca; Memoria: Cuban Art of the 20th Century; (California/International Arts Foundation 2001); 
 José Veigas; Memoria: Artes Visuales Cubanas Del Siglo Xx; (California Intl Arts 2004); 

1964 births
Cuban contemporary artists
Living people